The Roman Catholic Diocese of Bafatá is a diocese located in the city of Bafatá in Guinea-Bissau.

History
 March 13, 2001: Established as Diocese of Bafatá from the Diocese of Bissau

Leadership
 Bishops of Bafatá (Roman rite)
 Bishop Carlos Pedro Zilli, P.I.M.E. (March 13, 2001 - March 31, 2021)

See also
Roman Catholicism in Guinea-Bissau
Roman Catholic Diocese of Bissau

Sources
 GCatholic.org
 Catholic Hierarchy

Roman Catholic dioceses in Guinea-Bissau
Christian organizations established in 2001
Roman Catholic dioceses and prelatures established in the 21st century
2001 establishments in Guinea-Bissau
Bafatá